Rambin (Rügen) station is a railway station in the town of Rambin, Mecklenburg-Vorpommern, Germany. The station lies on the Stralsund-Sassnitz railway and the train services are operated by Ostdeutsche Eisenbahn GmbH.

Train services

The station is served by the following service(s):

Regional services  Rostock - Velgast - Stralsund - Lietzow - Sassnitz/Binz

References

Rügen
Railway stations in Germany opened in 1883
Buildings and structures in Vorpommern-Rügen
Railway stations in Mecklenburg-Western Pomerania